Andrei Rafailovich Nagumanov (born 21 February 1987) is a Russian professional football player and is currently player-assistant of German side TSG Öhringen.

Club career
He made his debut for FC Zenit St. Petersburg on 20 September 2006 in a Russian Cup game against FC Chita.

He played two seasons in the Russian Football National League for FC Tekstilshchik-Telekom Ivanovo and FC Sportakademklub Moscow.

In the latter part of his career he moved to Germany, where his wife is from, and played for fifth-tier Oberliga Baden-Württemberg teams.

Personal life
His older brother Roman Nagumanov is also a footballer.

External links
 
 
 Andrei Nagumanov at FuPa

1987 births
Footballers from Saint Petersburg
Living people
Russian footballers
Russian expatriate footballers
Russia youth international footballers
Russia under-21 international footballers
Association football midfielders
FC Zenit Saint Petersburg players
FC Tekstilshchik Ivanovo players
FK Žalgiris players
A Lyga players
Oberliga (football) players
Russian expatriate sportspeople in Lithuania
Russian expatriate sportspeople in Germany
Expatriate footballers in Lithuania
Expatriate footballers in Germany
FC Sportakademklub Moscow players